James Albert Cullum (9 April 1898 – 21 November 1948) was an Australian rules footballer who played with South Melbourne in the Victorian Football League (VFL).

Notes

External links 

1898 births
1948 deaths
Australian rules footballers from Victoria (Australia)
Sydney Swans players
Maryborough Football Club players